Rajasthan is the largest state in terms of area and is Seventh most populous state in India through having a low population density. Jaipur is the largest and most populated metropolitan area in Rajasthan. Jodhpur, Kota and Bikaner being in order. Bhiwadi, Alwar and Udaipur being the cities with most growth in recent years in both terms of population and area. The population projections are calculated using geometric increase, excluding Bhiwadi. By 2031, the state may have five cities with populations above one million, three cities over two million and one with over five million people.

References

Rajasthan
Cities
Cities and towns in Rajasthan